The Au Train Formation is a geologic formation in Michigan. It preserves fossils dating back to the Ordovician period.

See also

References
 
 Pictured Rocks: Geologic Formations|url=http://www.nps.gov/piro/naturescience/geologicformations.htm|publisher=US National Park Service|accessdate=June 14, 2020

Ordovician System of North America
Ordovician Michigan
Lower Ordovician Series